"Ugly Little Monsters" is a comic book storylines based on the Buffy television series that was published in Buffy the Vampire Slayer #40–42 by Dark Horse Comics. The arc was reprinted, along with issue #39 of the series, in a trade paperback collected edition.

Story description

General synopsis
Joyce Summers has died, and now the emotions of the Scooby Gang are running high, and little things seem to be causing problems. Since everybody is preoccupied with their grief, anger, guilt, and regret the 'good fight' seems less important. However soon green demon-children are tearing apart the Summers home, violently attacking its members. One of the Scoobies is holding a secret that might prevent the key to victory.

Buffy the vampire Slayer #40

Comic title: Ugly Little Monsters, part 1 

Joyce Summers has died, and now the emotions of the Scooby Gang are running high, and little things seem to be causing problems. Since everybody is preoccupied with their grief, anger, guilt, and regret the 'good fight' seems less important. However soon green demon-children approach the Summers house.

Buffy the vampire Slayer #41

Comic title: Ugly Little Monsters, part 2 

Tara is still feeling like she does not fit in with the Scooby Gang. She is getting closer to Willow, but more envious of Willow's friendships with Buffy and Xander. The little green monsters thrive on the fun of negative emotions like jealousy.

Buffy the vampire Slayer #42

Comic title: Ugly Little Monsters, part 3 

Buffy and her friends are getting attacked by more ugly, bad-smelling, little, green monsters. They seem to really dislike Buffy, and are proving more of a problem than expected. It soon seems one of Buffy's friends maybe linked to the menace.

Continuity
Supposed to be set in late Buffy season 5, after "The Body".
 Takes place after Autumnal, and before 'Chaos Bleeds' comic prequel.

Canonical issues

Buffy comics such as this one are not usually considered by fans as canonical. Some fans consider them stories from the imaginations of authors and artists, while other fans consider them as taking place in an alternative fictional reality. However unlike fan fiction, overviews summarising their story, written early in the writing process, were 'approved' by both Fox and Joss Whedon (or his office), and the books were therefore later published as officially Buffy merchandise.